Holy Cross Catholic Cemetery in Colma, California is an American Roman Catholic cemetery operated by the Archdiocese of San Francisco.

History 

Several notable people are buried at Holy Cross, including former politicians, and people of the California Gold Rush. Many of the people interred at the Catholic Calvary Cemetery of San Francisco, were reburied between 1937 and 1945 at Holy Cross in a project to relocate graves outside of the city. There is a memorial sculpture features three crosses and reads: “Interred here are the remains of 39,307 Catholics moved from Mt. Calvary Cemetery in 1940 and 1941 by order of the San Francisco Board of Supervisors. Rest in God’s Loving Care.”

This cemetery also contains one British Commonwealth war grave, of a Canadian Infantry soldier of World War I.

Two of the three cemetery sequences in the film Harold and Maude were filmed here.

Notable burials

A
 Joseph Alemany, San Francisco's first archbishop
 Joseph Alioto, Mayor of San Francisco (1968-1976)
 Pedro Altube, rancher
 Delos R. Ashley, Nevada U.S. Representative

B
 Winifred Bonfils, reporter and columnist
 Jimmy Britt, boxer
 Pat Brown, 32nd Governor of California
 Benny Bufano, sculptor

C

 Joe Carcione, "The Green Grocer" columnist and personality
 Eugene Casserly, U.S. Senator
 John Chapman, Civil War soldier, Medal of Honor recipient
 Joe Corbett, Major League Baseball (MLB) pitcher
 Frank Crosetti, New York Yankees MLB player, teammate of Joe DiMaggio

D

 Michael de Young, co-founder of the San Francisco Chronicle, namesake of the M. H. de Young Memorial Museum.
 Joe DiMaggio (1914–1999), MLB player, Hall of Fame member
 John G. Downey, 7th Governor of California

E
 Eddie Erdelatz, first head coach of Oakland Raiders football team

F
 James Graham Fair, Bonanza King, U.S. Senator
 Cy Falkenberg, baseball player
 Abigail Folger, Heiress, socialite, Manson murder victim
 Edwin Alexander Forbes, Adjutant-General of California
 Kathryn Forbes, writer
 Tirey L. Ford, Attorney-General for California
 Charlie Fox, MLB manager, coach, and scout

G
 Oliver Gagliani (1917–2002) photographer, and educator
 A.P. Giannini, founder of Bank of America
 Charlie Geggus, MLB player, who played one season for the  Washington Nationals of the Union Association
 Vince Guaraldi, jazz musician known for composing music for animated television adaptations of the Peanuts comic strip including their signature melody, "Linus and Lucy"

H
 Edward Joseph Hanna, San Francisco's Third Archbishop
 Michael A. Healy, American Captain in United States Revenue Cutter (predecessor of the United States Coast Guard)
 William Edward Hickman, American convicted murderer
 Edward Higgins, General of the Salvation Army
 Eric Hoffer, American moral and social philosopher

I

 Samuel Williams Inge, U.S. Representative for Alabama

K
 Paul Kantner, guitarist for Jefferson Airplane
 George Kelly, MLB Hall of Famer

L
 Bill Lange, MLB player for Chicago Cubs (1893–1899)
 William Joseph Levada, San Francisco's Seventh Archbishop, Prefect emeritus of the Congregation for the Doctrine of the Faith (elevated to Cardinal in 2006)

M
 Ralph Maradiaga (1934–1985), Chicano artist, printmaker, muralist
 Leo McCarthy, former California Lieutenant Governor
 Pete McDonough, bail bondsmen
 James A. McDougall. U.S. Senator
 Joseph Thomas McGucken, San Francisco's Fifth Archbishop
 Theresa Meikle, first woman elected to Superior Court Judge in a major American city
 John J. Mitty, San Francisco's Fourth Archbishop
 John J. Montgomery, pioneer aviator, aerodynamicist, and physicist; first American to fly in a heavier-than-air machine
 Maggie Moore, silent film actress
 George Moscone, Mayor of San Francisco

N
 George Hugh Niederauer, San Francisco's Eighth Archbishop
 John I. Nolan, U.S. Representative
 Mae Nolan, California's first female congressperson

O
 William S. O'Brien, Bonanza King
 Bryan O'Byrne, actor
 M.M. O'Shaughnessy, San Francisco city engineer

P
 James D. Phelan, Mayor of San Francisco, U.S. Senator
 Ralph Pinelli, MLB player

Q
 John Raphael Quinn, San Francisco's Sixth Archbishop

R
 Patrick William Riordan, San Francisco's Second Archbishop
 Angelo Joseph Rossi, Mayor of San Francisco (1931–1944)
 Pietro Carlo Rossi, wine maker and first President Italian Swiss Colony

S
 Hank Sauer, MLB player
 Eugene Schmitz, Mayor of San Francisco (1902–1907)
 Fred Scolari, professional basketball player
 John F. Shelley, Mayor of San Francisco (1964–1968)
 William M. Stewart, U.S. Senator

T
 Ethel Teare, American silent film actress

W
 Richard J. Welch, U.S. Representative
 Kaisik Wong, fashion designer
 William J. Wynn, U.S. Representative

Z
 Frank Zupo, MLB player with the Baltimore Orioles

References

External links

 Official website
 Holy Cross Cemetery, Colma – interment.net

Cemeteries in San Mateo County, California
Protected areas of San Mateo County, California
Roman Catholic cemeteries in California
Roman Catholic Archdiocese of San Francisco